Ted Whittall is a Canadian actor who is best known for his roles in Wicker Park (2004), The Bone Collector (1999) and Daydream Nation (2010). He also made appearances in Smallville and Schitt’s Creek.

Filmography

Film

Television

References

External links

Ted Whitall on Twitter

Living people
Canadian male film actors
Year of birth missing (living people)
Best Supporting Actor in a Television Film or Miniseries Canadian Screen Award winners
Canadian male television actors